Bangalore Palace is a royal palace located in Bangalore, Karnataka, India, in an area that was owned by the Rev. John Garrett, the first principal of the Central High School in Bangalore, now famous as Central College. The commencement of the construction of the palace is attributed to him.

Construction

Interior décor

Renovation

 The palace grounds are used for holding public events including music concerts.

The grounds are now (2018) severely neglected with only the portion immediately in front of the palace cultivated

Many international artists have performed in the grounds. Today a legal battle between government and the Mysore royal family has seen a ban of commercial activities. Nevertheless, a number of private companies controlled by the royal family runs a number of wedding halls on the grounds. For the past 34 years the oldest security agency of Karnataka named Scorpion Security Ltd has their national headquarters inside the palace premises.

Over the past few years, the palace grounds have been hosts to major music artists like: Iron Maiden, Aerosmith, Backstreet Boys, Don Moen, David Guetta, Elton John, Deep Purple, Textures, Amon Amarth, Lamb of God, Mark Knopfler, Akon, The Black Eyed Peas, The Rolling Stones, Metallica, Michael Learns to Rock, Roger Waters, Guns N' Roses, The Prodigy, No Doubt, Sepultura, Scorpions, Enrique Iglesias, Machine Head, and Cradle of Filth.

Iron Maiden's performance in 2007 was a historic gig named Eddfest in the sub-continent. The concert was part of the band's A Matter of Life and Death Tour. The name Eddfest is taken from the band's mascot Eddie. The concert is the largest paid concert ever to take place in India with an estimated 38,000 people in attendance with 4000 people watching from outside the venue without tickets. It marked the first visit of Iron Maiden to the Indian subcontinent, and the first major heavy metal concert to take place in the country.

Jay Sean, Ludacris and Flo Rida performed in Palace Grounds on 22 September 2011 for the opening ceremony of the Champions League T20.

Metallica performed at the palace grounds on 30 October 2011 as part of the Rock N India festival, their first show in India which was attended by 31,000 people. It would also turn out to be the last concert to take place as the state government and police stopped giving permission for any future musical events or concerts at the venue (all concerts banned)

Fun World
Fun World is an amusement park situated in the palace grounds. This amusement park is allowed under permission from Smt Pramoda Devi Wadiyar, owner and legal heir to Late Sri Srikantadatta Narasimharaja Wadiyar. It has various joy rides, water park and snow room.

See also
Wadiyar
Mysore Palace

References

External links

Houses completed in 1944
Palaces in Bangalore
Tourist attractions in Bangalore
Convention centres in India
Kingdom of Mysore
1862 establishments in India
Amusement parks in Karnataka
20th-century architecture in India
19th-century architecture in India